The More I See You is a 1995 album by Oscar Peterson, the first album recorded since his stroke, in 1993.

Track listing 
 "In a Mellow Tone" (Duke Ellington, Milt Gabler) – 4:53
 "Gee Baby, Ain't I Good to You" (Andy Razaf, Don Redman) – 4:45
 "On the Trail" (Harold Adamson, Ferde Grofé) – 7:03
 "When My Dreamboat Comes Home" (David Franklin, Cliff Friend) – 8:17
 "Ron's Blues" (Oscar Peterson) – 8:05
 "For All We Know" (John Frederick Coots, Sam M. Lewis) – 8:39
 "Blues for Lisa" (Peterson) – 9:15
 "Squatty Roo" (Johnny Hodges) – 5:39
 "The More I See You" (Mack Gordon, Harry Warren) – 6:02

Personnel

Performance 
 Oscar Peterson – piano
 Benny Carter – alto saxophone
 Clark Terry – flugelhorn
 Ray Brown – double bass
 Lorne Lofsky – guitar
 Lewis Nash – drums

References 

1995 albums
Oscar Peterson albums
Telarc Records albums
Ray Brown (musician) albums